Wei Qun ( born 10 February 1971 in Zigong, Sichuan) is a Chinese football coach and a former player who spent the majority of his career with Sichuan Quanxing where he was a defender while internationally he represented China in the 1996 Asian Cup.

Playing career
Wei Qun would start his career playing for the various youth teams for his hometown football team Sichuan before he was called up to the Chinese under-23 football team who happened to call themselves the Chinese Olympic team and were allowed to take part in the 1991 Chinese league campaign where they finished seventh. After an unsuccessful Olympics qualification campaign he returned to Sichuan to start his senior football career however it almost ended before it began when on May 1, 1993, he had an altercation with several men and was stabbed several times. Luckily he was able to make a full recovery and go on to establish himself as a vital member of the team, which soon saw him called up to the Chinese national team where he took part in the 1996 Asian Cup and was part of the team that saw China reach the quarter-finals.
 
After spending his whole career within Sichuan and nearing the end of his career the club decided to appoint him as their new part-time deputy general manager in 2002, however his perceived brash handling of several senior players negatively affected the club and he was loaned out Yunnan Hongta F.C. for the rest of the season. By the end of the 2003 league season Wei did not return to Sichuan and would instead decide to retire from football. He would eventually move into management and would join the second-tier football club Sichuan FC in October 2008.

International goals

References

External links
 Team China Stats
 

1972 births
Living people
Chinese football managers
Chinese footballers
Footballers from Sichuan
China international footballers
Sichuan Guancheng players
Yunnan Hongta players
Association football defenders